Yukie is a feminine Japanese given name.

Possible writings
Yukie can be written using different combinations of kanji characters. Here are some examples: 

幸恵, "happiness, blessing/favor"
幸栄, "happiness, prosperous"
幸江, "happiness, creek"
由紀恵, "reason, era, blessing"
由紀江, "reason, era, creek"
雪映, "snow, shine"
雪瑛, "snow, sparkling"
雪絵, "snow, picture"
雪恵, "snow, blessing/favor"
雪枝, "snow, branch"
雪江, "snow, creek"

The name can also be written in hiragana ゆきえ or katakana ユキエ.

Notable people with the name
Yukie Arata (荒田 雪江, 1914 – date of death unknown), Japanese swimmer.
Yukie Chiri (知里 幸恵, 1903–1922), Japanese transcriber and translator.
Yukie Kawamura (川村 ゆきえ, born 1986), Japanese gravure idol, tarento and actress.
Yukie Koizumi (born 1958), Japanese former professional tennis player
Yukie Nakama (仲間 由紀恵, born 1979), Japanese actress, singer and idol.
Yukie Nakayama| (中山 由起枝, born 1979), Japanese sport shooter.
Yukie Nishimura (西村 由紀江, born 1967), Japanese pianist.
Yukie Ohzeki (大関 行江, born 1949), Japanese table tennis player.
Yukie Sakaguchi (坂口 優希恵, born 1994), Japanese professional soft-tip and steel-tip darts player

Notable people with the surname
Hiroto Yukie (雪江 悠人, born 1996), Japanese footballer

Fictional Characters
Yukie Kaufmann (由季江・カウフマン), character in Message to Adolf (originally titled Adolf in English).
Yukie Mayuzumi (黛 由紀江), character in Maji de Watashi ni Koi Shinasai! (Majikoi ~ Oh! Samurai Girls).
Yukie Mishiro (三代 雪絵), a character from the light novel series Ginban Kaleidoscope.
Yukie Utsumi (内海 幸枝), character in the novel, film, and manga Battle Royale.
Yukie Shirofuku (白福 雪絵), a manager of Fukurōdani Academy in Haikyū!!.

Japanese feminine given names